Badachro is a former fishing village, in the north west Highlands of Scotland.

Geography
Badachro sits about 3 km south of Gairloch on the shore of Gair Loch, and is a natural harbour popular with yachts. Approximately 2 miles to the SE are located the Fairy Lochs, the site of a 1945 plane crash which is now a designated war grave. The crash site has been preserved as a memorial to the USAAF servicemen who lost their lives in the accident, and is accessible by a rough track near the Shieldaig Lodge Hotel.

Badachro is in the Highland council area.

Queen Victoria visited Shieldaig Lodge Hotel in 1877 but never made it to Badchro village itself as the roads were too bad. Today Shieldaig Lodge is home to a small watersports centre Gairloch Canoe and Kayak Centre.

Fishing
At the end of the nineteenth century, Badachro was a busy fishing village. Cod, landed here and at Gairloch, was dried at one of two curing stations at Badachro - one on Eilean Horrisdale (cured by resident Kenneth BAIN, master seaman) and one on Eilean Tioram. Today, lobsters, crabs and prawns are landed for markets in the south and in Europe.

Footnotes

Populated places in Ross and Cromarty